The Great Southern and Western Railway (GS&WR) was an Irish gauge railway company in Ireland from 1844 until 1924. The GS&WR grew by building lines and making a series of takeovers, until in the late 19th and early 20th centuries it was the largest of Ireland's "Big Four" railway networks.

The core of the GS&WR was the Dublin Kingsbridge –  main line; Ireland's "Premier Line", and still one of her most important main line railways. The company's headquarters were at Kingsbridge station. At its greatest extent the GS&WR included, in addition to the Dublin – Cork main line, the Dublin –  and  – Waterford lines and numerous branch lines.

Origins
There had been earlier attempts to set up main line railways to the south of Ireland but the 1840s efforts of Peter Purcell, a wealthy landowner and mail coach operator, and his associates were ultimately to prove successful with the implementation of a bill passed on 6 August 1844 for the GS&WR.  Purcell was actively assisted by engineer John Benjamin MacNeill who had done surveys for the London and Birmingham Railway and had connections in London.  The GS&WR's vision to provide a single railway for most of the south of Ireland found favour with United Kingdom Prime Minister Robert Peel as having likely more profitably for wealthy investors and because a single company would be easier to control; these factors likely easing the passing of relevant legislation.

Network

Dublin – Cork Main Line
William Dargan, Ireland's foremost railway contractor, built much of the GS&WR's main line and a number of its other routes.

Work began in January 1845 with services commencing on 4 August 1846. Trains were scheduled to take about 2hr 35min for the  stretch to Carlow and coach connections were arranged to Kilkenny, Clonmel, Waterford and the evening mail coach for Cork.

In October 1849 the main line reached the outskirts of Cork, where the GS&WR opened a temporary terminus at Blackpool. The final  of line from Blackpool to the centre of Cork includes a  tunnel and was not completed for another six years. Services through the tunnel began in December 1855, running to and from a second temporary terminus beside the River Lee. Finally the present  terminus in Glanmire Road opened in July 1856.

Expansion and competition

From the outset the ISE was worked by the GS&WR. The Waterford and Kilkenny Railway had already reached Lavistown, and thus completion of the ISE enabled GS&WR services to reach . The W&KR reached  in September 1854 but its relations with the GS&WR were poor, which impeded traffic between Dublin and Waterford by this route. In 1877 the W&KR took over the Central Ireland Railway and became the Waterford and Central Ireland Railway. The GS&WR took over the W&CIR in 1900, thus belatedly bringing the rail route between Dublin and Waterford under the control and operation of a single company.

The GS&WR competed with the Midland Great Western Railway for many years. The GS&WR also had designs on rail traffic to the west of Ireland. In 1859 the GS&WR opened a branch line from the Dublin – Cork main line to  where it connected with the MGWR's Dublin – Galway main line. In the latter half of the 20th century Córas Iompair Éireann made this GS&WR branch part of its Dublin – Galway main line.

Waterford, Limerick and Western Railway

In 1901 the GS&WR bought the Waterford, Limerick and Western Railway, which gave it both the Waterford – Limerick – Athenry – Claremorris – Collooney cross-country route and the North Kerry line and branches. The WLWR, recently dubbed the Western Rail Corridor, crossed MGWR territory. It complemented the radial MGWR lines from Dublin, enabling Limerick – Galway and Galway – Sligo traffic, and linked intermediate destinations in the west of Ireland. For a very short time the MGWR exercised running powers over the Athenry – Limerick section of this route.

North Wall extension

The line was opened in 1877 to resolve limitations with the GS&WR neither having rail access convenient to the cattle market at Cabra nor to the docks at North Wall where there was a requirement for goods, cattle and passenger services.  The London and North Western Railway (LNWR) was supportive of the venture as was the rival Midland Great Western Railway (MGWR) who were to receive tolls for part of the route.

The branch opened on 2 September 1877 diverging from the main GS&WR line at Islandbridge Junction before tunneling under Phoenix Park to Cabra where cattle sidings and pens were constructed. Joint running rights were obtained over the MGWR route until Church Road junction in the North Wall complex, after which the route diverged to the GS&WR's new cattle pens and sidings. Link spurs were available at Newcomen Bridge to Amiens Street station and to the LNWR station at North Wall for passenger ships to Great Britain.

Drumcondra link line
1891 had seen the connection to the Dublin, Wicklow and Wexford Railway (DW&WR) following the opening of the Dublin loop line from Westland Row with additional traffic to the Liffey branch line. The GS&WR eventually moved on an opportunity to open an alternative route line from at what was to be known as Drumcondra junction which diverged just before the junction to the MGWR at Glasnevin. The route ran to the north of Croke Park then rejoined the MGWR just before Church Road junction in the North wall complex allowing the same access at North Wall for GS&WR services.  Opening on 1 April 1901 it avoided the MGWR's Liffey branch tolls. A spur from the Drumcondra link line to the DW&WR at Amiens Street was finally realised on 1 December 1906.

GS&WR hotels
In an effort to encourage tourism the Killarney Junction Railway, which was operated by the GS&WR, opened a hotel next to  station. This was in 1854, which made it the first railway-owned hotel in Ireland and one of the first of its kind in the World. In the following years the GS&WR established further hotels in County Kerry at Caragh Lake, Kenmare, Parknasilla (about 3/4 of a mile to the southeast of Sneem) and Waterville.

In 1925 the hotels became part of Great Southern Hotels, a subsidiary of Great Southern Railways. The Great Southern Hotels Group was dissolved in 2006, when its hotels were sold off separately to private investors.

GS&WR strike
In September 1911 the workers of the Great Southern and Western Railway went on strike nationally after two checkers at Kingsbridge goods station in Dublin were suspended for refusing to handle timber that had been delivered by "blackleg" lorry drivers during a strike by the timber merchant's workers. The British Army was brought in to guard tracks and trains, and Protestant strike-breakers from elsewhere in Ireland to do the work of the strikers. The strike was savagely broken in two months, with the railway's proprietor, William Goulding, sacking 10% of the workers for their participation in the strike. Goulding told his associates, "Now that we have the men defeated, we'll never have any more trouble."

People

Chairmen
Peter Purcell, a wealthy landowner and mail coach operator, was the main mover of the GS&WR railway and became its first chairman:
1844 — Peter Purcell
1846 — George Carr
1849 — Sir Edward McDonnel
1860 — William Haughton
1878 — James C. Colvill
1897 — Joshua Pim
1901 — William Goulding

Civil engineers
Alternative titles include engineer, engineer-in-chief, chief civil engineer.
1844 — Sir John Benjamin Macneill
1847 — George Miller (Also locomotive engineer)
1864 — Valentine Browne and Charles G. Napier; permanent way engineers for Dublin and Cork respectively
1874 — William Scott replaced Napier as permanent way engineer Cork.
1878 — Kennett Bayley
1901 — Albert Gordon
1921 — John F. Sides

Locomotive engineers
At different times in its history the GS&WR variously used the titles Locomotive Engineer, Locomotive Superintendent or Chief Mechanical Engineer to describe the same post.
1844–47 — John Dewrance
1847–64 — George Miller
1864–83 — Alexander McDonnell
1883–86 — John Aspinall
1886–96 — Henry Ivatt
1896–1911 — Robert Coey
1911–13 — Richard Maunsell
1913–21 — E.A. Watson
1921–23 — J.R. Bazin

Incidents

Lombardstown train crash

A year after the 1911 strike, on 5 August 1912 at 8.50pm, an excursion train from Killarney crashed in Lombardstown, near Mallow in Cork. The driver had been on duty from 3.50am. Of the 200 passengers on board, 96 were seriously injured, one of whom later died as a result.

Kiltimagh train crash
On 19 December 1916, in foggy conditions, the driver of a ballast train failed to see a red signal at Kiltimagh, Co. Mayo. The train, carrying many track workers, crashed into an empty cattle train, killing six people.

Aftermath

Great Southern Railways
An Act passed by the Dáil Éireann in 1924 merged the GS&WR with the Midland Great Western Railway, the Cork, Bandon and South Coast Railway and most other railways wholly within the Irish Free State to form the Great Southern Railway. In January 1925 the GSR merged with the Dublin and South Eastern Railway to form the Great Southern Railways. Cross-border railways were excluded from the mergers.

Córas Iompair Éireann
In 1945 further amalgamation with the Grand Canal Company and the Dublin United Tramway Company created Córas Iompair Éireann ("Irish State Transport Company"). CIÉ was nationalised in 1950, but was divided into separate rail and road companies in 1987. Since then, the railways have been operated by Iarnród Éireann ("Irish Rail").

GS&WR routes today
GS&WR routes remain some of the most heavily used in Ireland, linking Dublin with Limerick, Cork, and Waterford. The coats of arms of these cities still adorn the facade of Heuston Station.

See also
History of rail transport in Ireland
Iarnród Éireann
Rail transport in Ireland

Notes

References

Sources and further reading

Defunct railway companies of Ireland
Irish gauge railways
Railway companies disestablished in 1924
Railway companies established in 1844